Chasing Christmas is a 2005 contemporary re-telling of the 1843 Charles Dickens classic novella A Christmas Carol. This ABC Family film, written by Todd Berger and directed by Ron Oliver, stars Tom Arnold as Jack Cameron, who is a man with a Scrooge-type personality. He is stuck with his wife, whom he caught with another man at their daughter's Christmas play. The sad events of his life, including his wife's infidelity, led him to hate Christmas. This prompted the Ghost of Christmas Past (Leslie Jordan) and Ghost of Christmas Present (Andrea Roth) to show Jack what Christmas is all about. However, Christmas Past wanted to stay in the past, and Jack and Christmas Present ended up on an adventure to put Christmas Past back on track.

Brittney Wilson, who played the daughter of Jack Cameron, was nominated for Best Performance in a TV Movie, Miniseries or Special - Supporting Young Actress at the 27th Young Artist Awards.

See also
 List of Christmas films
List of ghost films
Adaptations of A Christmas Carol

References

External links
 ABC Family: Chasing Christmas

ABC Family original films
2005 television films
2005 films
Films based on A Christmas Carol
American Christmas films
Christmas television films
Films with screenplays by Todd Berger
2000s Christmas films
Films directed by Ron Oliver
2000s English-language films